Egon Pajenk (23 July 1950 – 19 August 2022) was an Austrian footballer who played as a defender. He died on 19 August 2022, at the age of 72.

References

External links
 
 Egon Pajenk at RapidArchiv 

1950 births
2022 deaths
People from Murtal District
Austrian footballers
Association football defenders
Austria international footballers
Austrian Football Bundesliga players
SK Rapid Wien players
FC Admira Wacker Mödling players